This is a list of prisoners of Berg concentration camp, which was operated in Nazi-occupied Norway between 1942 and 1945.

A cross symbol next to a name denotes that the person died during World War II, at Berg or elsewhere.

See also
List of Arkivet prisoners
List of Grini prisoners

References
Notes

Bibliography

Lists of prisoners and detainees
Norway history-related lists
World War II-related lists